Little Lord or Küçük Ağa is a Turkish Comedy Series. The series was broadcast on channel Kanal D in Turkey and produced by Turker İnanoğlu. It premiered on January 28, 2014 & The final episode was aired on 17 March 2015 after 50 episodes and 2 seasons. Also broadcast on Indian Television dubbed in Hindi on Zindagi.

Plot 

Little Lord or Little Master Mehmetcan Acar (Emir Berke Zincirdi) is a child who is tensed because his parents are planning divorce. MehmetCan’s grandfather (played by Zeki Alasya) is a landlord (Ağa in Turkish) and according to the local tradition, Mehmetcan’s Father and also Mehmetcan are heirs of his property. Mehmetcan’s grandparents loves him so much and everybody in his town calls him Küçük Ağa (Little Master).

Mehmetcan’s mother is a doctor , while his father owns an advertising agency. But their relationship has ups and downs and mostly hassling. Although having a strong love, they couldn’t achieve to solve their problems and live peacefully. Mehmetcan is very sad about the situation and he tries hard to find a way to force his parents to reunite. He do naughty things and pranks, cause funny troubles, etc. to make his parents realize his feelings.

Cast 

 Birce Akalay as Sinem Acar.
 Sarp Levendoğlu as Ali Acar.
 Emir Berke Zincidi as Mehmetcan Acar.
 Zeki Alasya as Mehmet Ağa.
 Nazan Diper as Esma.
 Ruhsar Ocal as Nur Sipahi.
 Şukru Turen as Adnan Sipahi
 Kayhan Yıldızoglu as Burhan Sipahi
 ada elbir as ece.

References

External links
Küçük Ağa (TV Series 2014)
 

2011 Turkish television series debuts
Turkish drama television series
Turkish television series endings
Television series produced in Istanbul
Television shows set in Istanbul
Television series set in the 2010s